This is Finland is an illustrated children's book by Finnish authors  and , translated into English by Owen F. Witesman.
It introduces young children to the history, culture and geography of Finland.
It was first published in 2007 by the Finnish publishing house Otava under the original title "Tatun ja Patun Suomi" (Swedish name: "Det här är Finland") and has won the Finnish  book price for the same year.

It is part of a collection (the Tatu ja Patu collection) of six illustrated books for children describing everyday life.

References 

 

2007 children's books
Otava (publisher) books
Books about Finland
Finnish children's literature